Cecil Parr (2 August 1847 – 13 January 1928) was a British tennis player in the early years of Wimbledon.  He only entered the Wimbledon singles once (in 1879) and beat George Montgomerie, Hubert Medlycott, Thomas Hoare and Charles Barry before losing in the semi finals to Reverend John Hartley.

References

1847 births
19th-century male tennis players
1928 deaths
English male tennis players
British male tennis players
Tennis people from Cheshire